African Queen was built at Folkestone in 1780, though almost surely under a different name. She became a slave ship in 1792 and made two complete slave voyages. On her first slave voyage she suffered a high mortality, both among her slaves and her captains and crew. A privateer captured her in 1795 as she was on her way to Jamaica with slaves while on her third slave trading voyage.

Career
African Queen first appeared in Lloyd's Register (LR) in 1793 with Williams, master, J.Anderson, owner, and trade Bristol–Africa. It gave her origin as Folkestone and her build year as 1783. She had been rebuilt in 1785, and had undergone lengthening and a "good repair" in 1791. However, the 1796 volume amended the build year to 1780.

1st slave voyage (1792–1793): Actually, African Queen left Bristol on her first slave trading voyage on 16 January 1792. She left with 37 crew members and enlisted three more on 3 March on the African coast. She had arrived at Old Calabar on 17–18 March, and she acquired her slaves there. While she was acquiring slaves, at least 21 crew members died, including two captains in succession. Captain Samuel Stibling died on 14 May, and Captain Hamet Forsyth, who had replaced Stribling, died on 1 October. While African Queen was on the coast she employed two smaller vessels, Dragon, and Fame, as ship's tenders.

African Queen sailed from the coast of Africa either on 10 October or 11 November. Captain James Lloyd, who had replaced Forsyth, died at sea on 1 December; Captain Long, originally her third mate, took command. She arrived at Montego Bay, Jamaica, on 18 January 1793. She had embarked 330 slaves and she landed 214, for a mortality rate of 35%. At Montego Bay she discharged three crew men and enlisted two. She left Jamaica with 19 crew members. She left on 11 March and arrived back at Bristol on 6 May.

2nd slave voyage (1794–1795): Captain Thomas Williams acquired a letter of marque on 13 June 1794. Williams, of Bristol, sailed for the firm John and Alexander Anderson &
Co. on four different slave ships.

He sailed from Bristol on 28 June 1794, bound for West Africa. She acquired 411 slaves at Calabar. She arrived at Grenada on 19 October and landed 401 slaves, for a mortality rate of about 1%. She had left Bristol with 31 crew members and suffered two crew deaths by the time she reached Grenada. African Queen sailed from Grenada on 18 November and arrived back at Bristol on 12 January 1795.

3rd slave voyage (1795): African Queen underwent a second good repair in 1795. Captain Williams then sailed from Bristol on 18 May 1795 bound for West Africa. African Queen gathered her slaves in the Sierra Leone estuary.

A privateer captured three British slave ships off the west coast of Hispaniola on about 15 December 1795 as they were on their way to Jamaica. African Queen, Williams, master, was one of the three. She was carrying 411 slaves.

In 1795, 50 British slave ships were lost. This was the largest annual loss in the period 1793 to 1807. Seven slave ships were lost on their way from Africa to the West Indies.

Notes

Citations

References
 
 

1780 ships
Age of Sail merchant ships of England
Bristol slave ships
Captured ships